On 7 May 2015, an election took place to elect members of the North Warwickshire Borough Council in England. It was held on the same day as other local elections. It saw the Conservative Party gaining control of the council.

The previous election saw Labour narrowly gaining control of the council. This election saw the Conservatives gaining 5 seats from Labour. UKIP had significant gains in the popular vote increasing their share by over 23%, although they did not win any seats.

References

2015 English local elections
May 2015 events in the United Kingdom
2015
2010s in Warwickshire